Desire is the second studio album by American post-punk band Tuxedomoon, released in 1981 by Ralph Records. The album was reissued on CD in 1987 by Cramboy, bundled together with No Tears.

Critical reception

By the critics who reviewed it, Desire was less favorably received than Tuxedomoon's first album, Half-Mute. A critic at Last Sigh magazine gave the album a positive review and said "this is an example of a band who explore the music they compose -- they play their own original style of music that can't be compared to any specific style of music."

Track listing

Personnel
Adapted from the Desire liner notes.

Tuxedomoon
 Steven Brown – alto saxophone, soprano saxophone, keyboards, lead vocals
 Peter Dachert (as Peter Principle) – bass guitar, guitar, synthesizer, drum programming
 Blaine L. Reininger – violin, guitar, keyboards, arrangement, lead vocals
 Winston Tong – lead vocals, backing vocals

Additional musicians
 Vicky Aspinall – violin (track B4)
 Al Robinson – cello (tracks A1–A3, B4)

Production and design
 Gareth Jones – production, engineering
 Stefano Paolillo – photography
 Patrick Roques – cover art, design
 Tuxedomoon – production

Release history

References

External links
 

1981 albums
Charisma Records albums
Crammed Discs albums
Celluloid Records albums
Missing Link Records albums
Ralph Records albums
Virgin Records albums
Tuxedomoon albums
Albums produced by Gareth Jones (music producer)